Puinaua, a.k.a. Poyanáwa, is a Panoan language of Brazil.

References

Panoan languages